Fritz Gaulhofer (born 25 February 1966) is an Austrian former equestrian. He competed in two events at the 2004 Summer Olympics.

References

External links
 

1966 births
Living people
Austrian male equestrians
Austrian dressage riders
Olympic equestrians of Austria
Equestrians at the 2004 Summer Olympics
People from Weiz District
Sportspeople from Styria